Ludger is a masculine given name. Notable persons with the name include:

 Ludger Alscher (1916–1985), German archaeologist
 Ludger Beerbaum (born 1963), German equestrian
 Ludger Desmarais, Canadian professional ice hockey player
 Ludger Dionne (1888–1962), Canadian businessman and politician
 Ludger Duvernay (1799–1852), Canadian publisher
 Ludger Fischer (born 1957), German historian
 Ludger Gerdes (1954–2008), German artist
 Ludger Kühnhardt (born 1958), German political scientist
 Ludger Lemieux (1872–1953), Canadian architect
 Ludger Lohmann (born 1954), German organist
 Ludger Pistor (born 1959), German actor
 Ludger Rémy (1949–2017), German harpsichordist, conductor and musicologist
 Ludger Stühlmeyer (born 1961), German cantor, composer, and musicologist
 Ludger Sylbaris (1870s–1929), Martiniquais circus artist

Characters 
 Ludger Will Kresnik, the main protagonist in the video game Tales of Xillia 2
 Ludger, a reaper in the manga Black Butler by Yana Toboso

See also

References 

German masculine given names
Dutch masculine given names